Muskoka  may refer to:

Canada

Geographical
 Lake Muskoka, lake located between Port Carling and Gravenhurst, Ontario, Canada
 Muskoka River, a river in the Muskoka District of Ontario, Canada

Municipalities
 District Municipality of Muskoka, a regional municipality in Central Ontario, Canada
 Muskoka Lakes, an area municipality of the District Municipality of Muskoka, Ontario, Canada.

Political
 Parry Sound—Muskoka, a federal electoral district in Ontario, Canada
 Muskoka—Ontario, federal electoral district represented in the House of Commons of Canada from 1925 to 1949
 Muskoka (provincial electoral district), an electoral riding in Ontario, Canada

Other
 Muskoka Airport, a small regional airport located south of Bracebridge, Ontario, Canada
 Muskoka Cottage Brewery, a microbrewery
 Muskoka Magazine, a large format lifestyle magazine published ten times per year in Bracebridge, Ontario.
 Muskoka Wharf, steamship located in the town of Gravenhurst, Ontario on the southern edge of Muskoka Bay on Lake Muskoka
 Muskoka Wild, a United Hockey Union-sanctioned junior ice hockey team from Port Carling, Ontario, Canada